Tropical Storm Grace holds the record for being the farthest northeast forming tropical cyclone in the Atlantic basin. The seventh named storm of the slightly below average 2009 Atlantic hurricane season, Grace formed from an extratropical cyclone over the Azores on 4 October. It strengthened to attain peak sustained winds of 65 mph (100 km/h) and developed an eye-like feature, although cold sea surface temperatures inhibited the development of thunderstorm activity near the center. The storm lost its tropical characteristics on 6 October, and the storm's remnants merged with a separate system near the British Isles on 7 October.

Grace had only minor effects on land, although while it was passing through the Azores, islands close to the storm's center recorded winds of up to 44 mph (71 km/h) and moderate rainfall. Although not solely related to the cyclone, heavy rainfall in Portugal led to some street flooding. The remnants also impacted parts of Ireland and the United Kingdom, where rainfall approaching 2 in (51 mm) and tropical storm-force winds were recorded. However, no damage occurred.

Meteorological history

Tropical Storm Grace originated from a large extratropical cyclone that formed along a cold front on 27 September, roughly 470 mi (755 km) east of Cape Race, Newfoundland. Initially attached to an occluded front, the low detached from the system and gradually acquired tropical characteristics. By 1 October, shower and thunderstorm activity began to develop near the center of the system as it tracked through the central Azores. However, the following day, convection began to decrease over the system, and the National Hurricane Center (NHC) ceased monitoring it. Over the following two days, the system executed a counter-clockwise loop near the Azores. During the afternoon of 4 October, convection redeveloped around the center of the low and was classified as a tropical storm near São Miguel Island. Although the storm was tropical at this time, the NHC did not issue advisories for several hours.

The first advisory from the NHC was issued at 11:00 AST on 4 October; at this time, the system was officially named Grace, the seventh named storm of the 2009 Atlantic hurricane season. The storm featured relatively deep convection around an eye-like feature. Although Grace was over waters normally not warm enough for tropical cyclogenesis, low wind shear allowed the convection to persist. A steady northeastward track was taken by the storm in response to a southerly flow over the northwestern Atlantic. The storm intensified slightly as it moved over decreasing sea surface temperatures, with winds estimated at 65 mph (100 km/h) early on 5 October; operationally it was held at 70 mph (110 km/h), but was downgraded due to uncertainties in the storm's intensity as it was progressing over cold waters.

A large extratropical cyclone near Grace caused the storm to deteriorate in organization, with convection weakening and becoming asymmetric. By this time, the storm was over  waters, likely inhibiting convective development. Shower and thunderstorm activity continued to diminish throughout the day on 5 October; however, Grace maintained tropical characteristics, namely a deep, warm core. Early on 6 October, the NHC issued their final advisory on Grace as it merged with a frontal system over the northeastern Atlantic. Just prior to merging, the lowest pressure in relation to the storm was recorded at 986 mbar (hPa; 29.12 inHg). The extratropical remnants of Grace persisted for roughly 18 hours before dissipating over the Celtic Sea early on 7 October. However, the United States Naval Research Laboratory continued to monitor the system for several more hours until it moved over the North Sea.

Although officially designated a tropical cyclone by the NHC, Météo-France, the French meteorological service, stated in their annual report to the World Meteorological Organization that Grace should not have been classified a tropical system. In their report, they argued that although the storm presented deep convection, an eye-like feature, and winds above 60 mph (95 km/h), the overall development of Grace was more similar to that of a mid-latitude non-tropical cyclone. However, operationally, Météo-France considered Grace to be a subtropical cyclone. They also criticized the NHC for warning on this system based on recent trends of the link between global warming and increased hurricane activity.

Impact and records

Upon being classified a tropical cyclone within the Azores, a few islands received minor rainfall and high winds. While merging  with the frontal system on 6 October, the storm's outer bands produced heavy rains and strong winds over parts of Portugal, resulting in some street flooding. In higher elevations, wind gusts were estimated to have exceeded .

Due to the storm's relatively rapid forward movement by the time it reached the United Kingdom, rainfall was limited. In Ireland,  of precipitation fell in the city of Cork. Late on 6 October, the remnants of Grace moved inland over Wales, bringing heavy rains and high winds to the region. Maximum rainfall in the United Kingdom reached  in Capel Curig.

Operationally, Grace was not classified as a tropical storm until it reached latitude 41.2°N. This marked the second northernmost formation of a tropical storm in the Atlantic on record; only Tropical Storm Alberto of 1988 had formed farther north. However, a post-storm analysis concluded that Grace had actually become a tropical storm 12 hours earlier than initially estimated, placing its location of development further south, at 38.5°N. The storm still marked the farthest northeast a tropical cyclone formed in the Atlantic basin, breaking the record set by Hurricane Vince in 2005.

In its Tropical Cyclone Report on Grace, the National Hurricane Center reported that the formation of Grace was poorly forecast. The first mention of the precursor low on 1 October predicted that it would not develop into a tropical or subtropical cyclone. Over the following three days, the system was not mentioned in the NHC's tropical weather outlooks until just prior to Grace's classification. The lack of preceding outlooks was attributed to the storm's unusual location and the sparsity of data for storms in the region.

See also

Tropical cyclones named Grace
List of Azores hurricanes
Tropical cyclone effects in Europe
Hurricane Carrie – Another storm that affected the British Isles as an extratropical storm, in 1957
Hurricane Vince
Hurricane Ophelia (2017) – Easternmost storm to attain Major hurricane status in the North Atlantic basin
Hurricane Pablo  – Another system that underwent tropical transition at a high latitude, close to Europe.

References

External links

The National Hurricane Center's Advisory Archive for Tropical Storm Grace

2009 Atlantic hurricane season
Atlantic tropical storms
Hurricanes in the Azores
Hurricanes in Europe
Grace